Ubida is a genus of moths of the family Crambidae.

Species
Ubida amochla Turner, 1922
Ubida hetaerica Turner, 1911
Ubida holomochla Turner, 1904
Ubida ramostriellus (Walker, 1863)

References

Natural History Museum Lepidoptera genus database

Crambinae
Crambidae genera
Taxa named by Francis Walker (entomologist)